Jani Savolainen (born October 5, 1988) is a Finnish former professional ice hockey right winger.

Savolainen played five games for KalPa during the 2007–08 SM-liiga season, scoring one assist. He would then play in Mestis for Jokipojat, Hokki and Mikkelin Jukurit. He also played in the Ligue Magnus for LHC Les Lions and the Hockeyettan for Piteå HC.

References

External links

1988 births
Living people
Finnish ice hockey right wingers
Hokki players
Jokipojat players
KalPa players
LHC Les Lions players
Mikkelin Jukurit players
People from Kuopio
Piteå HC players
Finnish expatriate ice hockey players in France
Finnish expatriate ice hockey players in Sweden
Sportspeople from North Savo